The 2019 ADAC GT Masters was the thirteenth season of the ADAC GT Masters, the grand tourer-style sports car racing founded by the German automobile club ADAC. The season began on 27 April at Oschersleben and ended on 29 September at the Sachsenring after seven double-header meetings.

Entry list

Race calendar and results
On 23 September 2018, the ADAC announced the 2019 calendar.

Championship standings
Scoring system
Championship points are awarded for the first fifteen positions in each race. Entries are required to complete 75% of the winning car's race distance in order to be classified and earn points. Individual drivers are required to participate for a minimum of 25 minutes in order to earn championship points in any race.

Drivers' championships

Overall

Junior Cup

Trophy Cup

Teams' championship

References

External links

ADAC GT Masters seasons
ADAC GT Masters